The "Former Ode on the Red Cliffs" is a piece of writing in the fu form, written by the Chinese poet Su Shi in 1082, describing a trip that Su Shi took with his friends on the Yangtze River, which took them past the purported site of the Battle of Red Cliffs.

Background
After Su Shi was arrested for his poetry satirizing policies of the Song court, known as the Crow Terrace Poetry Trial, he was demoted to serve as the deputy of the regiment of Huangzhou.

Synopsis
The author and his friends took a boat trip by the Red Cliffs. He sang a song, and one of his friends accompanied him with a xiao, a traditional Chinese flute. The tune was sad, so the author asked why. The guest said that the place reminded him of Cao Cao, who had been a hero of an era, but was no longer there. This made him realize the insignificance of human beings in comparison to the river and universe. Su Shi, however, considered the matter from a relativism aspect that both an individual and nature can be constantly changeable or immortal. He also pointed out that everything has its own owner, so one should not take what does not belong to him/her, except those eternal treasures of the creator like the moon or wind which everyone can enjoy. The guest was delighted at last and fell asleep along with the author.

There are two rhapsodies.

Artwork

Chinese literature
Song poetry
Su Shi